Kesari ( (Marathi/Sanskrit) is a 2020 Indian Marathi language film directed by Sujay Sunil Dahake and produced by Santosh Ramchandani under the banner of Bhavna Films with Manohar Ramchandani as co-producer. The film starring Virat Madke, Rupa Borgaonkar, Mahesh Manjrekar, Vikram Gokhale, Mohan Joshi follows the story of Wrestling sport, this motivating story goes around a young boy from a poor family who wants to win Maharashtra Kesari title.
The music of the film is composed by AV Prafullachandra & Saket Kanetkar, The film was theatrically released on 28 February 2020.

Cast 

 Virat Madake
 Mahesh Manjrekar
 Vikram Gokhale
 Mohan Joshi
 Nandesh Umap
 Umesh Jagtap
 Chhaya Kadam
 Jaywant Wadkar
 Nachiket Purnapatre
 Satayappa More
 Dyanratna Ahiwale
 Rupa Borgoankar
 Padmanabh Bind
 Prasad Dhendh

Release 
The film was theatrically released on 28 February 2020.

Soundtrack

References

External links 

2020 films
2020s sports drama films
2020s Marathi-language films
Indian sports drama films
2020 drama films